The Star Awards (Chinese: 红星大奖) are awards for artistic and technical merit in the media organisation Mediacorp of Singapore where Mediacorp recognises entertainers under their employment for outstanding performances of the year. 

The awards are given annually in a ceremony. The various category winners are awarded a trophy, with initial designs featuring various star shapes. The star was subsequently removed and the trophy is designed as a S shaped column, depicting the star.

History 
The 1st Star Awards presentation was held on 26 February 1994, took place at the Caldecott Broadcast Centre, MediaCorp TV Theatre with an audience of about 500 people. There have no other pre-show and post-awards ceremony held in that year. Winners were announced during the presentation of the ceremony, the ceremony also presented a popularity contest, with Li Nanxing, Chew Chor Meng and Zoe Tay winning the Most Popular Actor and Actress award, respectively. The first Best Drama Serial was only awarded during the third Awards in 1996 to Tofu Street for an outstanding overall performance. The nominees are determined by a team of judges employed by Mediacorp and winners are selected by a majority vote from the entire judging panel. Chew Chor Meng, Li Nanxing, Terence Cao, Sean Say, Desmond Sim, Chen Liping, Chen Xiuhuan, Pan Lingling, Aileen Tan, and Zoe Tay received the award as the 10 Most Popular Artistes, with five awards given to male and female artistes; these artistes were awarded by popularity among the television audience based from the public via telephone and SMS text voting. Since 1997, the number of recipients for each category were expanded to ten.

Since 1994, the ceremony used a sealed envelope to reveal the name of the winners, as in tradition of most award ceremonies.

Institutions and milestones
The first Best Actress awarded was Fann Wong, in her performances in Chronicle of Life (Chinese: 缘尽今生) as Fang Ling 方玲 in the drama. Fann Wong is the first leading actress who have won this award since the awards was introduced in the 1995 ceremony. At the same ceremony; Li Nanxing received the award for his role in Wounded Tracks (Chinese: 伤城记) and it is given in honour of a Mediacorp actor who has delivered an outstanding performance in a leading role. Also, Zhu Xiufeng received the award for her supporting role in Chronicle of Life (Chinese: 缘尽今生) and it is given in honour of a Mediacorp actress who has delivered an outstanding performance in a supporting role in the 2nd year of the Star Awards ceremony.

Between 1995 and 2003, the Special Achievement Award is given to one artiste who have made significant contributions in the performance of his/her respective field of profession over the past few years. The award was discontinued in 2004 until it was revived again in 2018 with Marcus Chin receiving the award. Also, each ceremony ends with the Best Actor and Actress award, but recent ceremonies' last award would be Top 10 Most Popular Male or Female Artistes award, a popularity contest open for all nominated Mediacorp Artistes.
Beginning in the 1998 ceremony, the variety categories were introduced in the awards, and variety programmes, as well as the artistes playing a role in these programmes were now made eligible; these includes Sitcoms, Variety Programme Hosts, and Variety Special (a one-off episode with a longer runtime, such as awards ceremony or live finals). For the first time in the awards' history, Technical Categories were also presented, but they were taped outside the ceremony on a separate date, and presented on a clip montage due to time constraints; these practice would later be done on later years except for 2010–15, where it was done on a single show instead. The 2000 ceremony further added awards in recognition to News and Current Affairs team and the Top Rated Drama Serial and Variety Programme.

Beginning in the 2004 ceremony, the All-Time Favourite Artiste Award was introduced in the place of Special Achievement Award. Chew Chor Meng, Li Nanxing and Zoe Tay received the award after winning the Top 10 Most Popular Male or Female Artistes award from 1994–2003. It is given in honour of an artiste who has won the Top 10 Most Popular Male Artistes or Top 10 Most Popular Female Artistes for ten times (not necessary to be consecutive). Artistes who receive the award will no longer be eligible for the running of the respective Top 10 Most Popular Male or Female Artistes awards from that particular year onwards, allowing younger MediaCorp artistes have a chance to win the popularity awards as well. 24 artistes have been awarded the All-Time Favourite Artiste award since its inception, and it has been awarded in almost every ceremony since except 2007, 2013 and 2018.

The ceremonies were held annually in April to honour television talents from works from the previous year; prior to the 2007 ceremony, the ceremony were held at the end of the year while there is no ceremony in 2008 due to a format change.

In the 2010 ceremony, held in 2010, introduced the six awards, Favourite Male Character, Favourite Female Character, Most Unforgettable TV Villain, Male Media Darling, Female Media Darling and Rocket Award. The first three awards were decided by online voting with the results being announced during the first ceremony. The Rocket Award was also introduced, which mainly focuses on the artiste who contributed the most improvement throughout the past year.

In 2014, the 20th Star Awards ceremony was held. The title of the Star Awards also short-formed to Star Awards 20 as a remarkable awards night. The first ceremony was held at the MediaCorp TV Theatre with the veteran artistes; Chen Shucheng who was the first Star Awards hosts came back as a co-hosts after 20 years hosting the first ceremony. Samuel Chong, Dasmond Koh, Vivian Lai, Lee Teng, Pornsak, Zhang Wei and Zhou Ruzhu and was held at the MediaCorp TV Theatre. Social Media Award and The Most Popular Regional Artiste Award were introduced at the ceremony. The second ceremony was held at Suntec Singapore International Convention and Exhibition Centre with hosts Guo Liang and Quan Yi Fong.

2014 also saw a revision of quota towards the category, as categories requires at least ten nominations in order to be presented; this result in the suspension of three awards, Best News Presenter, Best Current Affairs Presenter, and Best Newcomer. However, despite 8World (renamed from the Channel 8 News and Current Affairs Team in January 2019) had fulfilled the minimum quota of 10 nominations, these awards have yet to be presented since its last presentation in 2013, while Best Newcomer returned except for 2016 and 2017, both of which were not presented due to the same reason.

In 2015, both ceremony was held on 19 April 2015 and 26 April 2015. It's the last year that Mediacorp presented the awards at the venue of Caldecott Broadcast Centre, MediaCorp TV Theatre (hence the Caldecott subtitle was present in the name of ceremony). Both ceremonies were held in the venue before moving to MediaCorp campus at 1 Stars Avenue for the next ceremony.

At the 2016 ceremony, the Professional and Technical awards  have been moved to a backstage awards and also the last time it held a double ceremony (not counting prelude or special episodes). The online Favourite award categories were held for the final time, with Jeanette Aw nominated again for Favourite Female Character and Favourite Onscreen Couple (Drama). Aw won six voting-based awards in Show 1 in 2015 including three Most Popular Regional Artiste Awards, Social Media Award and Favourite Female Character award for her role in The Journey: Tumultuous Times. Aw expressed her intention to be removed from the voting, but was rejected as Mediacorp said that the awards were determined though online voting, and still requiring her to participate. There was a change in lineup of the awards streamlined to 19 categories. A new category, 'Best Programme Host', was created with a merger of two hosting awards (Best Variety Show Host and Best Info-Ed Programme Host) due to a similar presentation style in both the variety and info-ed programmes, as well as similar eligibility criteria. 'Best Evergreen Artiste', which was based on the performances for drama veterans, was also introduced in 2016.

At the 2017 ceremony, online voting categories were also streamlined, by putting more emphasis placed on the Top 10 Most Popular Artiste awards, while the Favourite Male and Female Character, and Favourite Onscreen Couple awards, as well as Social Media Award were dropped due to the change. Due to the switch in measuring television viewership, the Top Rated Variety Programme and Top Rated Drama Serial awards were also suspended.

The 2018 ceremony saw revamps towards the Top 10 Popularity Awards, whereas a poll of 1,000 people representing a wide demographic across Singapore's population, were conducted independently by an accredited market research company, will be used to shortlist the nominations. The results of the poll weighed 50% towards the combined total, while the other 50% comes from the public vote (with 50% weighed on telepoll and online votes each). Eligibility criteria for performance and popularity categories were also revised, opening up to non-Mediacorp artistes; eligible artistes were now required to lead a role in a programme or play as a supporting role/assistant host in at least three eligible programmes or at least 30 episodes out of all eligible programmes, whichever applicable. Best Evergreen Artiste were also accessed on veteran artistes based on a full calendar year, as opposed to a single programme.

The 2019 ceremony, coinciding the silver jubilee of the ceremony on 14 April 2019, introduced two categories to feature miniseries, which were the Best Short-form Drama Serial and Best Short-form Variety Programme.

The 2021 ceremony, initially announced to be held on 26 April 2020 and announced that the event is postponed to the second half of 2020 due to the ongoing COVID-19 pandemic, making it the first ceremony in 13 years since the revision of the eligibility period in 2008 where the ceremony would not be held on the month of April; On 7 August 2020, the ceremony was pushed to 18 April 2021 and expanding the eligibility to include 2020 programs, resulting in the increase of nominations for most of the award categories, from the traditional five to seven. The ceremony also introduces radio awards coinciding the 85th anniversary of radio broadcasting in Singapore. For the first time since 2014, the award ceremony was announced to be held outside studios, located on the Jewel Changi Airport and Terminal 4.

The 2022 ceremony brought back the popularity awards that were discontinued during the earlier awards. They were introduced as MyPick! Awards and the awards were presented in the backstage livestream instead of the Main ceremony.

The 2023 ceremony saw introductions of the Most Popular Rising Star award and revamps towards the Top 10 Popularity Awards. Nominees are no longer shortlisted into the Top 40 nominees, instead they are eligible as long as they have acted in a Lead role or main host in an eligible programme or a Supporting role or episodic host in 3 eligible programme/30 episodes in total across all eligible programme, while having more than 5 years of professional screen acting and/or screen/audio hosting experience before the award ceremony, Most Popular Rising Star have similar requirements, but they can be nominated with being a Supporting role or episodic host in a single eligible programme, while having 5 or less years of professional screen acting and/or screen/audio hosting (excluding cameo appearances/experiences before turning 18 years of age), and being 18 years and above to be nominated.

The last 2 awards at Star Awards 2022 were the Best Actor and Best Actress Awards instead of the Top 10 Awards.Previously, technical category awards (e.g. Best Director, Best Screenplay, Best Variety Show Producer, etc.), newscaster and current affairs awards and, for a time, the Young Talent Award (for child actors) were held separately at a gala dinner (or afternoon conference) due to time constraints and results and clips from the event would be shown either during the ceremony, or live-streaming before the ceremony. Between 2010 and 2015, and again in 2017, those technical awards were presented in Show 1 (or during the three prelude episodes, in 2017), while the Show 2 presented the main awards. Since 2016 (with the exception for 2017), the format was reverted with the technical category awards presented at an off-site ceremony.
In accordance to the social distancing measures, the ceremony is conducted closed-doors, and international celebrities communicate via teleconference due to travel restrictions.

Theme Tune 
Since 1995, the signature theme tune titled "Linking the World", composed by Christopher Evans. It was subsequently modified to have different renditions of the same tune for subsequent ceremonies.

Since 2019, the original theme tune was re-composed as "Starlight" 《星光》, with a new rendition and lyrics. This new rendition was used as the opener for the ceremony since 2021.

Trophy 

The Star Awards trophy has seen four different designs, since its inception in 1994. In the first ceremony, The trophy was designed with a circular column and a star-shaped circle capping the top. This trophy only been used in only in this 1994 ceremony. Between 1995 until 1997 ceremony, the trophy was designed with a straight column topped and a gold star. This trophy had been used in three ceremonies. The trophy was changed to a cone-like shape with a bigger star in the ceremony of 1998 and 1999.

Since 2000, A new trophy made in Shanghai was designed, weighing 4 kg and cost S$1,000 each. It is designed with a crystal body shaped in the letter "S", and from another angle, shaped in the letter "A", forming the initials of the "Star Awards". The trophy used to come in different colors every year.

Awards ceremonies

Lists of award ceremonies 
To date, 27 ceremonies were held, as summarised below:

Ceremony hosts 
The following individuals have hosted the Star Awards ceremony.

Telecast 
The major awards are presented at a live televised ceremony, commonly in April following the relevant calendar year in order to focus on the full calendar year; prior to the 2007 ceremony, the ceremony were held at the end of the year (usually December) while there is no ceremony in 2008 due to a format change.

2007 was the first ceremony to have a double ceremony, one that paid tribute to the 25th Anniversary of television, and a second ceremony being the normal ceremony. Between 2010 and 2015, the Professional and Technical awards (given out to backstage crew and scriptwriters) were telecast and presented in the first show, and the main awards on the second, airing the following week. While the first show was still held at MediaCorp TV Theatre, the second show was, for the third time in Star Awards history, being held on the new location of Resorts World Sentosa, after 1996 and 2006. Both of the ceremonies were broadcast live on 18 and 25 April 2010. The post-show was held after the second ceremony at 10pm on Channel U.

In 2016, although the show was a two-part program, the technical awards was, for the first time since 2009, presented in an off-site non-televised presentation instead of being presented live in show 1. In their place, the main ceremony (which was presented in show 2) was also split into two shows, allowing to put more emphasis on mostly variety/info-ed award categories and drama award categories, for shows 1 and 2, respectively. The Post-show Party, airing after show 2, focuses on online voting award categories. For the first time in Star Awards history, the awards for the Top 10 Artistes were presented in separate shows instead of single show, with the female artistes awarded in show 1, and the male artistes on show 2.

At the 2017 ceremony, in a gap of eight installments since 2009, the ceremony was reverted to one show, and the post-show party was scrapped. In-lieu of the "3+1" change, a three-episode weekly preludes aired on Sundays before the main ceremony. The preludes were removed in 2018.

With the merger of MediaCorp with SPH MediaWorks on 1 January 2005, nominees now include artistes and shows from MediaCorp Channel U, formerly MediaWork's Chinese language channel, and were broadcast for said channel since. Between 2010 and 2014, xinmsn provided its first online Live streaming for both the ceremony as well as backstage, and since 2013, Toggle (both the website and the smartphone/smart TV application). However, these streams were only viewable exclusive to Singapore. Starting from the 2019 ceremony, the awards are also livestreamed on YouTube, and is viewable to the world.

Venues 
In 1994, the first Star Awards were presented at the Caldecott Broadcast Centre, MediaCorp TV Theatre and the following year until 2015; however, seven ceremonies were held outside the studios: in 1996, the venue of Star Awards changed to World Trade Centre, Harbour Pavilion and was hosted by Guo Liang and Yvette Tsui. In 2006, the ceremony was held at St James Power Station, near VivoCity and Sentosa. Between 2010 and 2014, the ceremony was also held outside location while the show was split into two, with the first show held at Caldecott Hill, while the second show was held at Resorts World Sentosa (2010 and 2011), Marina Bay Sands (2012 and 2013) and Suntec City (2014).

In 2016, the awards had since held at the new Mediacorp Campus, MES Theatre @ Mediacorp, and it became the presentation's current venue with incredibly spacious interior and stunning architectural designs, the 1,500-seater performance venue features tiered seating in its stalls and two circle levels, including removable seats at the lower stall and additional audience sitting space at the orchestra pit for people with special needs.

Awards categories

Judged categories

Popularity categories

 The MY PICK! Awards was started during Star Awards 2022 and held during the show’s Backstage Live segment.

Technical Awards
 As of 2018, only four technical awards were presented during off-site ceremony.

 Best Screenplay 最佳剧本
 Best Variety Producer 最佳综艺编导
Best Director 最佳导演
Best Variety Research Writer 最佳综艺资料撰稿

Discontinued or suspended awards
One-time Awards

40th Anniversary Evergreen Achievement Award 电视40长青奖 (Awarded only in 2003)
Talented Artiste Award 多才多艺红星奖 (Awarded only in 2004)
 Honorary TV Award (Awarded only in 2013)
Perfect Combo 最合拍搭档 (Awarded only in 2022)
Most Attention Seeking New-Gen Host 最抢镜新晋主持人 (Awarded only in 2022)

Technical Awards
Note: All the categories were introduced in 1998 (unless otherwise stated), and these awards were presented outside broadcast except for 2010–2015, where it was presented on one show.

Retired awards
A number of awards have either suspended or retired throughout the years, including some that have been replaced by similar award categories in other areas of recognition:

Suspended Awards

Records
As of :

Overall wins/nominations by a performer, program, etc.

Most wins by a drama serial in a single year
The Dream Makers II 志在四方 II - 12

Most nominations by a drama serial in a single year
The Dream Makers II 志在四方 II - 16

Drama series with all five wins in acting categories
Holland V 荷兰村 and The Dream Makers II 志在四方 II

Most Best Actor wins
Chen Hanwei 陈汉玮 - 7

Most Best Actress wins
Zoe Tay 郑惠玉, Huang Biren 黃碧仁 - 4

Most Best Actor nominations
Christopher Lee 李铭顺 - 14

Most Best Actress nominations
Zoe Tay 郑惠玉 - 14

Most Best Supporting Actor wins
Huang Yiliang 黄奕良 - 3

Most Best Supporting Actress wins
Xiang Yun 向云 - 4

Most Best Supporting Actor nominations
Chen Shucheng 陈澍城 - 10

Most Best Supporting Actress nominations
Xiang Yun 向云 - 11

Most Young Talent wins
Regene Lim 林咏谊 - 3

Artist with Most Theme Song wins
Kelvin Tan 陈伟联 - 4

Artist with Most Theme Song nominations
Fann Wong 范文芳 - 6

Most wins by a variety/info-ad programme in a single year
Love On A Plate 名厨出走记  - 4

Most nominations by variety/info-ad programme in a single year
Black Rose 爆料黑玫瑰 - 7

Most wins for a Variety Programme
City Beat 城人杂志, The Joy Truck 快乐速递, Say It If You Dare 有话好好说 and GeTai Challenge 歌台星力量  - 2

Most nominations for a Variety Programme
City Beat 城人杂志  - 6

Most wins for an Info-ad Programme
Tuesday Report 星期二特写 - 5

Most nominations for an Info-ad Programme
Tuesday Report 星期二特写 - 22

Most wins for a Variety Special
Star Awards 红星大奖 - 9

Most nominations for a Variety Special
Star Awards 红星大奖 - 22

Most Variety Show Host wins (programme hosts exclusive)
Sharon Au 欧菁仙, Mark Lee 李国煌 and Kym Ng 鐘琴 - 4

Most Variety Show Host wins (programme hosts inclusive)
Quan Yi Fong 权怡凤 - 8

Most Variety Show Host nominations (programme hosts inclusive)
Mark Lee 李国煌, Kym Ng 鐘琴 - 9

Most Info-Ed Programme Host wins
Belinda Lee 李心钰 - 2

Most Info-Ed Programme Host nominations
Guo Liang 郭亮, Bryan Wong 王禄江 - 5

All-time Favourite Artistes with ten consecutive Top 10 Most Popular Artistes awards
Zoe Tay 郑惠玉, Li Nanxing 李南星, Chew Chor Meng 周初明, Xie Shaoguang 谢韶光, Fann Wong 范文芳, Xiang Yun 向云, Rui En 瑞恩, Elvin Ng 黄俊雄 and Rebecca Lim 林慧玲

Awards and nominations
Star Awards had been nominated for 16 times since the Best Variety Special category was introduced in 1998 (with the exceptions for five shows, the award was not presented in years 2000 and 2018; while the ceremony were not nominated in years 1999, 2001 and 2006). As of 2021, eight shows, out of the total 22 ceremonies since 1997 were won, with their first win in 2007 which was awarded for the 2006's ceremony. Other categories for Star Awards, which were nominated or won, were also reflected in the table:

 Each year is linked to the article about the Star Awards held that year.

See also

 List of Asian television awards
Asian Television Awards- another Television Award Ceremony which recognizes Asian television.
TVB Anniversary Awards- an Award Ceremony in Hong Kong which was inspired by the Star Awards ceremony and was first held on 19 November 1997.
Primetime Emmy Awards- another Television Award Ceremony from United States.

References

External links 

 
Awards established in 1994
1994 establishments in Singapore
Mediacorp
Television awards